Hypersypnoides punctosa is a species of moth of the family Noctuidae first described by Francis Walker in 1865. It is found in Taiwan.

References

Moths described in 1865
Calpinae